The Marion Mets were a minor league baseball team based in Marion, Virginia that played in the Appalachian League from 1965 to 1976. They were affiliated with the New York Mets and played their home games at the Marion High School baseball field. Hall of Fame pitcher Nolan Ryan pitched for the team in 1965.

Year-by-year record

Notable alumni

Baseball Hall of Fame alumni

 Nolan Ryan (1965) Inducted, 1999

Notable alumni
 Jim Bibby (1965) MLB All-Star

 Jody Davis (1976) 2 x MLB All-Star

 Ed Figueroa (1966)

 Tim Foli (1968)

 Mike Jorgensen (1966)

 John Milner (1968)

 Jerry Morales (1966) MLB All-Star

 Joe Nolan (1969)

 Steve Renko (1965)

 Birdie Tebbetts (1967, MGR) 4 x MLB All-Star

 Alex Trevino (1974)

References

Baseball teams established in 1965
Defunct Appalachian League teams
Defunct baseball teams in Virginia
New York Mets minor league affiliates
1965 establishments in Virginia
1976 disestablishments in Virginia
Baseball teams disestablished in 1976